is a retired Japanese professional shogi player who achieved the rank of 5-dan.

Promotion history
The promotion history for Kanezawa is as follows:

1985: 6-kyū
1987: 1-dan
1999, April 1: 4-dan
2006, July 10: 5-dan
2021, May 17: Retired

References

External links
 ShogiHub: Kanezawa, Takashi

Japanese shogi players
Living people
People from Sapporo
Professional shogi players from Hokkaido
 Retired professional shogi players
1973 births